Spectrovenator ("ghost hunter", named because the holotype was unexpectedly found under the holotype of Tapuiasaurus) is a genus of basal abelisaurid theropod dinosaur that lived during the early Cretaceous period in what is now Brazil. It is known by a single species, S. ragei, recovered from the Quiricó Formation.

Description

Spectrovenator is known from a single specimen, MZSP-PV 833, stored in the Museu de Zoologia da Universidade de São Paulo, and was discovered in the Embira Branca Range, close to the Coração de Jesus Municipality, located in northern Minas Gerais. The specimen consists of a nearly complete skull, partial series of cervicodorsal vertebrae with ribs, a complete sacrum, partial series of caudal vertebrae, and well-preserved hindlimb and hip bones.

The well-preserved skull of Spectrovenator has several features which show it is a transitional taxon between Jurassic and Late Cretaceous abelisaurids. It shares several cranial features with Rugops, another basal abelisaurid, indicating a similar position on the evolutionary tree. More derived taxa possessed adaptations allowing for a broader chamber for the lower jaw muscles, but Spectrovenator lacked these. Instead, it contained plesiomorphic, or ancestral, traits in the temporal region of the skull. These features are a broad parietal surface between the supratemporal fossae and an elongated squamosal process of the postorbital. These traits meant Spectrovenator likely had a weaker bite force than more derived abelisaurids. The authors note this gives credence to the theory that bite force increased through evolution in abelisaurids. The authors conclude that based on the number of basal traits exhibited by Spectrovenator, only the post-Cenomanian abelisaurids had the necessary adaptations for abelisaurids' characteristic feeding strategy.

Spectrovenator has certain unique features in its skull that help differentiate it from the crania of other abelisaurids. These are: the posterior ramus of the maxilla is ornamented with vertically oriented grooves except for the smooth region in front of the maxilla-jugal suture; the lateral surface of the lacrimal is rugose except in the ventral section; a ventrally bowed posterior process of the jugal; a nuchal crest with a thin and smooth dorsal margin; a straight ventral margin of dentaries (part of the lower jaw) with a deep sulcus on the lateral surface; the dorsal margin of the surangular is slightly convex; and a longitudinal ridge along the posteroventral end of the mandibular ramus.

Importantly, Spectrovenator preserves a transversely concave nasal and a row of large foramina on the skull roof. These may represent the presence of blood vessels and nerves, probably related to the passage of the lateral nasal and supraorbital vessels and the trigeminal nerve.

Classification 
The authors of the description of Spectrovenator included it in a phylogenetic analysis to test its position within Abelisauridae. Many characters supported its placement within Abelisauridae. The recovery of Spectrovenator as a basal member within Abelisauridae is congruent with the age and morphology of this taxon. A simplified version of the analysis is shown below.

References 

Early Cretaceous
Fossils of Brazil
Fossil taxa described in 2020
Abelisaurs